Battambang municipality (Krong Battambang) is a municipality (krong)  of Battambang province, in north-western Cambodia. The provincial capital Battambang  lies within the municipality.

Administration 
The district is subdivided into 10 communes (khum).

Communes and villages

References

Districts of Battambang province